Anchoress is a 1993 British drama film directed by Chris Newby. It was screened in the Un Certain Regard section at the 1993 Cannes Film Festival.

The screenplay is partly based on accounts of an historical female anchorite, Christine Carpenter, who was walled into her anchorhold in a village church in Shere, Surrey, in southern England, in 1329. The story revolves around the girl's mystical visions of the Virgin Mary, the local reeve who wants to marry her, and the priest who walls her into his village church and his dislike of her mother, a midwife whom he regards as a witch.

The film is shot in black-and-white and visually resembles the works of Danish filmmaker Carl Theodor Dreyer, especially The Passion of Joan of Arc (1928).

Cast

 Natalie Morse as Christine Carpenter
 Gene Bervoets as Reeve (as Eugene Bervoets)
 Toyah Willcox as Pauline Carpenter
 Pete Postlethwaite as William Carpenter
 Christopher Eccleston as Priest
 Michael Pas as Drover
 Brenda Bertin as Meg Carpenter
 Annette Badland as Mary
 Veronica Quilligan as Daisy
 Julie T. Wallace as Bertha
 Ann Way as Alice
 François Beukelaers as Bishop
 Jan Decleir as Mason
 David Boyce as Ragged Martin
 Mieke De Groote as Ragged Martin's wife
 Erik Konstantyn as Carter
 Hugo Harold Harrison as Priest's boy

Year-end lists
 Honorable mention – Howie Movshovitz, The Denver Post

See also
 List of historical drama films

References

External links
 

1993 films
1993 drama films
Films directed by Chris Newby
British black-and-white films
Films set in the 14th century
Films set in Surrey
Drama films based on actual events
British drama films
Folk horror films
1990s English-language films
1990s British films